The Ambassador from New Zealand to Italy is New Zealand's foremost diplomatic representative in the Republic of Italy, and in charge of New Zealand's diplomatic mission in Italy.

The embassy is located in Rome, Italy's capital city.  New Zealand has maintained a resident ambassador in Italy since 1966.  The Ambassador to Italy is concurrently accredited to Albania, Bosnia and Herzegovina, Croatia, Cyprus, Greece, Kosovo, Malta, Portugal, and Slovenia.

List of heads of mission

Ambassadors to Italy
 Alister McIntosh (1966–1970)
 Ian Stewart (1970–1972)

Chargés d'Affaires in Italy
 Dick Atkins (1972–1973)

Ambassadors to Italy
 Phil Holloway (1973–1976)
 Eric Halstead (1976–1980)
 Jim Weir (1980–1983)
 Gordon Parkinson (1983–1986)
 Tony Small (1986–1990)
 Peter Bennett (1990–1994)
 Judith Trotter (1994–1998)
 Peter Bennett (1998–2003)
 Julie MacKenzie (2003-2008)
 Laurie Markes (2008-2010)
 Dr Trevor Matheson (2011-2014)
 Patrick Rata (2015- )
Anthony Simpson (Ambassador)

References
 New Zealand Heads of Overseas Missions: Italy.  New Zealand Ministry of Foreign Affairs and Trade.  Retrieved on 2008-03-29.

Italy, Ambassadors from New Zealand to
New Zealand, Ambassadors from New Zealand to